Hypopetalia pestilens, the white-dotted redspot, is a monotypic species of dragonfly in the family Austropetaliidae. It is endemic to central Chile. Its natural habitat is rivers. It is threatened by habitat loss.

References

Sources

Austropetaliidae
Fauna of Chile
Odonata of South America
Taxa named by Robert McLachlan (entomologist)
Insects described in 1870
Taxonomy articles created by Polbot
Endemic fauna of Chile